A kid influencer is someone under the age of 18 who have built/are building a presence on social media platforms creating content to generate views and engagements, that is often sponsored. Kid influencers operate in a similar fashion to adult influencers; they share their hobbies and personal activities with their audiences, while also marketing products that align with their brand through paid partnerships. Many social media platforms have an age minimum requiring users to be at least 13 years of age or older to hold their own accounts. This requirement results in many of the pages being run alongside the parent/guardian of the child when they are under the age requirement.

In 2020, influencer marketing company Grin named The Axel Show, Tiana Wilson, twins Mila and Emma, and Greta Thunberg as some of the top kid influencers.

The rise of this kind of advertising has raised many ethical and legal questions, especially since most of these influencers main fan bases are young children. It has also brought up concerns about protecting the child themselves from any corruption and/or manipulation from their parent or the brands they work with.

History

Early advertising 
Children have been in the entertainment space for a long time. In 1914, Jackie Coogan was appearing in silent films, and appeared in many films after that. By the time he turned 21 the $4 million he had earned throughout his career as a child star had been wasted by his parents. Coogan sued them, and was awarded $126,000. This led to the creation of the California Child Actor's Bill (Coogan Act), which was passed in 1939. When that space flourished, brands started picking up child actors to appear as spokespeople in commercials and paper ads, such as Shirley Temple for Royal Crown Cola in 1944.

In 1940, when television entered the homes of families across the nation, some of the earliest programming was directed at child viewers, including after-school and Saturday morning shows, to help keep kids entertained when the parents were consumed by other tasks.

Between the 1940s and 1950s, as these child-directed shows flourished, advertising took to the silver screen and often featured the same child actors that starred in the popular shows, like Miss France's Ding Dong School and Rootie Kazootie, who would interrupt programming to deliver commercial messages which reduced the lack of clarity between what was programming and what was an advertisement. This began to fizzle out as the very same actors and presenters began to refuse commercial work to focus on creative and theatrical work.

Advertising in 1960s, 1970s & 1980s 
As actors began to shift away from the commercial limelight, brands began to recognize that they still needed children in the advertisements to relate to the children they were targeting. From this an alternative grew, featuring child actors with little to no notoriety. They were often filmed playing with the toy and delivering a maximum of one or two speaking lines. Brands wanted to communicate the relatability of unknown actors who looked and acted like the kids they were targeting, to establish a sense of resemblance which then would turn into desire to have the product. Popular examples of this practice can be seen in commercials for popular toys at the time like G.I. Joe and Barbie dolls.

Transition to influencer marketing 
This is just a continuation of those same practices on a different scale. Blending the lines of stardom and relatability, child influencers create a different kind of relationship with their audience that is close knit and connected which they are constantly trying to nurture and grow. Kid influencers, and influencers in general, have built a close relationship with their following that makes their audience feel like they are apart of a community.

One of the first to make big waves in the space was seven-year-old Ryan Kaji or better known to his fans as Ryan's World, who began filming videos in 2015 and now has amassed a following of 30.3 million YouTube subscribers. Kaji has a variety of videos on his channel from family vlogs to viral challenges, but his channel is most well-known for his toy review videos in which he plays with new toys and shares his opinion on them. Brands recognized the potential of how powerful a child's influence actually is and acted on the opportunity to tap into their audience to make profits.

Alternative approach 
A more common approach into the market has been through the parents of the child sharing content featuring their child on that parent's account. When the child gains enough recognition, parents then create a separate page for them to form their own following and image independent of the parents'. The reason both these approaches are valid is because the parent is still the account owner, but the star is the child.

Kid agencies 
When influencers gain a substantial following, many brands may begin to partner with a creator. This can be overwhelming, and the creator may look to find an agent who specializes in influencer marketing to help manage their brand. Influencer marketing agencies can connect their influencers with brands that fit their niche/brand. The agent acts as a mediator between an influencer and the brand to make the process more efficient for the influencer. To fit the influx of kid influencers applying to agencies, some have created specialized programs, like Batterypop's Kidfluencer program, to provide a guided journey into influencer life for kids. The demand for kid-specialized agents has grown as fully dedicated companies like PocketWatch have completely narrowed their scope to only working with child influencers/stars.

Criticisms 
Parents and guardians of kid influencers have received criticism from child rights advocates and psychologists due to the unknown nature of the internet and the lack of transparency on sponsored posts. The blurred line of paid promotions versus organic content is nothing new amongst the influencer industry; however, the stakes are heightened with kid influencers as much of their audience is made up of children who do not necessarily have the media literacy skills to determine what is an advertisement and what is an unbiased opinion. In 2019, watchdog agency Truth in Advertising (TINA) filed a deceptive advertising complaint with the Federal Trade Commission (FTC) against Ryan Kaji, asking the organization to review the influential marketing tactics he was using to promote products to his young audience, as TINA believed he was using deceptive marketing tactics against his vulnerable audience.

Ethical considerations 
Many also have taken issue with the ethics of kid influencing, as there is not much research that demonstrates the long-term effects of fame and notoriety with influencers at such a young age. Children are being targeted by influencers and brands in ways that parents do not recognize as easily. Advertising to kids has been regulated by the government in the past, but not necessarily when it is the kid doing the advertising themselves. Parents of kid influencers argue that because it is often the parent doing most of the logistical background work, the kids cannot tell the difference from genuinely playing with toys versus doing so for paid promotion. There are many sides to the argument, but all can agree that there needs to be a discussion about teaching media literacy to children if they are going to be navigating the internet alone.

Influencer parents & families 
There is a concern that parents are exploiting their children on social media for money. There is currently no regulation for how much exposure parents showcase their children on social media. There is also no regulation for how much these parents make their children work on social media (doing TikToks, YouTube videos, etc.). There is also no regulation for who and where the money goes to that is generated through the content produced. These children cannot consent to being broadcast online either since they are just doing what their parents ask, and since they are growing up in the world of social media they think it is normal. There is also the concern that family centric content creators are broadcasting their kids far too often. Many already established family content creators have their cameras on the child as soon as they are born. These newborns are put onto display and are now part of the influencer family. Since they are only babies they have no say or consent to how they are being portrayed online.

Future effects on kid influencers 
Since most kid influencers don't have a say in the social media world they are thrusted into they may not like how they have been portrayed online. As these kids turn into teens and adults they will start to form their own identities and how they were portrayed by their parents online may not be who they truly are. They will also have to deal with the embarrassment of being recorded in their vulnerable moments. One of the main distinctions between child influencers and child actors is that the actors are playing a character the influencers are not. An example of this comes from an influencer family called The Labrant Fam, they filmed a video of them telling their daughter that they were giving away their family dog as an April Fools Joke. Their daughter was filmed crying and posted online for content. The Labrants later posted a video apologizing for putting their daughter in that spot.

Legal

Lack of laws protecting kid influencers 
There are very few laws protecting child influencers. There is, however, a bill is currently in committee that will is supposed to "Protecting the interests of minor children featured on for-profit family vlogs." This lack of protection has raised ethical concerns as to how child influencers will be protected in the future due to the fact that they participate in sponsored deals. Since children cannot legally operate social media accounts until the age of 13, their parents will do it for them. Parents will also take brand deals and sponsorships and will subject the children to advertise these sponsors, which the parents will take the money from sponsorships since the children do not know better. Since there are few laws protecting kid influencers this is legal. There is a push for laws such as the Coogan Act and the Fair Childs Labor Act of 1938 (FLSA) to protect child influencers as well.

California Child Protection Bill (Coogan Act) 

The California Child Protection Bill more commonly referred to as the Coogan Act, is a bill that requires that all money earned by children in the entertainment industry is their own. Their parents do control over the money. 15% of the money earned is placed in a Coogan Account which is a trust account made for the child's earnings. This bill does not apply to child influencers, but there is a push for this bill to be reviewed to include protection for child influencers.

France  
France is the only country protecting child influencers by law. Bruno Studer, who is a French politician, has a bill that is in effect in France called the Studer Bill. This bill requires parents of child influencers to "apply for authorization before their child is allowed to appear in any monetized content and that money will be locked away in an account." This bill is a protective measure to ensure that children influencers will be properly compensated for the work they do.

Children's Online Privacy Protection Act 
In 1998 Congress enacted the Children's Online Privacy Protection Act (COPPA) which required the Federal Trade Commission (FTC) to issue and enforce regulations concerning children's online privacy. The primary goal of COPPA is to give the parents and guardians of children the autonomy to decide what information is collected from their children online, the rule is designed to protect children under 13 while accounting for the dynamic and unknown nature of the Internet.

COPPA amendment 
In an effort to modernize the rule with the advancing industry, the FTC reviewed COPPA for two years and came to a revised version that went into effect in 2013. The amended Rule addresses the newer ways children use and access the internet, expanding on the definition of children's personal information to include persistent identifiers such as cookies. Revising this ruling helps give parents the authority to control the release of their child's personal information as it is keeping pace with evolving technologies.

References

 
Internet celebrities
Children by occupation